The I Corps, also known as I Strike Corps, of the Pakistan Army headquartered in Mangla, Azad Kashmir Territory of Pakistan. Known as I Strike Corps, it is one of two strike corps within its ten-manoeuvre Army corps. The I Strike Corps is one of the oldest and major formations of Pakistan Army.

Active in Indo-Pakistan wars, the I Strike Corps subordinated administrative units played an integral role in Kargil war, and also served in current War in North-West Pakistan. Its current Corps-Commander is Lieutenant General Ayman Bilal Safdar .

History 
The corps headquarters was raised in Abbottabad in 1958. Lt Gen Azam Khan was its first commander. It was the first Pakistani corps ever to take to the field.

1965 War 
During the 1965 war, the corps was one of two corps in action. It commanded all Pakistani troops north of Lahore and in Kashmir. During this time however, because of the sheer number of formations under its command, (8 divisions), it was found easier to split the formations into corps level task-forces, as a result in the 1965 war it acted essentially as a Field Army.

1971 war 
I Corps began the 1971 war with a force of two divisions forward supported by an armoured brigade, holding the Shakargarh salient. 15th Infantry Division was on the left side of the corps' frontage around Sialkot, 8th Infantry Division on the right east of the Degh Nadi, and 8th Armoured Brigade in support. Further back, but titularly part of the corps, was Pakistan's Army Reserve North of 6th Armoured Division and 17th Infantry Division.

Meanwhile, while the Indian attacks went on, the reserve formations did little. 6th Armoured Division remained near Pasrur waiting for orders, while 17th Infantry Division had significant detachments sent off to 23rd Infantry Division on the left and IV Corps on the right.

Yet the fighting in Shakargarh, while ultimately successful as the Indian aims were thwarted, resulted in 8th Armoured Brigade's heavy loss of armour and some territory was also lost. As a result, its commander, Lt Gen Irshad Khan, was recommended for court martial and dismissal; this was ultimately not carried out.

Structure 
The corps has not been in action since 1971, though its subordinate units have served on the Line of Control and the war on terror, on secondment to other formations. Its ORBAT is:

List of corps commanders

References

External links 
GlobalSecurity.org, Global Security Website about the I Corps
This shows the Formations Insignia

1
Military units and formations established in 1957
1957 establishments in Pakistan